James Douglas Mackay  (21 September 1905 – 23 December 1985) was a New Zealand rugby union player. A wing three-quarter, Mackay represented Wellington at a provincial level, and was a member of the New Zealand national side, the All Blacks, in 1928. He played two matches for the All Blacks, scoring four tries, but did not appear in any internationals.

Mackay studied at Victoria University College, graduating with a Bachelor of Arts in 1929 and a Bachelor of Science in 1933. During World War II he served with the Royal New Zealand Air Force (RNZAF) as an education officer. In October 1940 he was granted an honorary commission with the rank of flight lieutenant in the Administrative and Special Duties Branch of the RNZAF. In April 1942 he relinquished his honorary commission and was granted a temporary commission with the rank of flying officer, fourth year, acting flight lieutenant, and then flight lieutenant (temporary). In the 1946 New Year Honours Mackay was appointed a Member of the Military Division of the Order of the British Empire.

After his playing days, Mackay remained involved in rugby as a coach, selector and administrator. He was coach of the Victoria University first team from 1931, to 1935, the RNZAF team at Wigram from 1938 to 1942 and the Canterbury Agricultural College team from 1947 to 1952. He served as president of the Ellesmere sub-union in Canterbury from 1953 to 1954.

References

1905 births
1985 deaths
Rugby union players from New Plymouth
People educated at New Plymouth Boys' High School
Victoria University of Wellington alumni
New Zealand rugby union players
New Zealand international rugby union players
Wellington rugby union players
Rugby union wings
New Zealand military personnel of World War II
New Zealand Members of the Order of the British Empire
New Zealand rugby union coaches
New Zealand schoolteachers
New Zealand sports executives and administrators